Bohumil Mořkovský (December 14, 1899 – July 16, 1928) was a Czech gymnast who competed for Czechoslovakia in the 1924 Summer Olympics. He was born and died in Valašské Meziříčí, Moravia.  He died less than a month before he could have made a repeat Olympic appearance.

In 1924 he won a bronze medal in the vault competition. At the 1924 Summer Olympics he also participated in the following events:

 Rings - sixth place
 Individual all-around - 13th place
 Parallel bars - 13th place
 Rope climbing - 18th place
 Sidehorse vault - 23rd place
 Pommel horse - 31st place
 Horizontal bar - 41st place
 Team all-around - did not finish

Legacy 

In 2019, the Czech Postal System issued a postcard commemorating Mořkovský.  Although a kind gesture, it raises questions, considering that Mořkovský's only Olympic medal was only a bronze in an individual apparatus final.  Many other more accomplished Czech gymnasts have not received such commemoration.  Additionally, the commemoration raises interest because a likeness of two-time Olympic Gymnastics Rings Champion Albert Azaryan was erroneously used to depict Mořkovský.

References

External links
profile

1899 births
1928 deaths
People from Valašské Meziříčí
Czechoslovak male artistic gymnasts
Olympic gymnasts of Czechoslovakia
Gymnasts at the 1924 Summer Olympics
Olympic bronze medalists for Czechoslovakia
Olympic medalists in gymnastics
Medalists at the 1924 Summer Olympics
Sportspeople from the Zlín Region